Above Suspicion may refer to:
Above Suspicion, a 1941 novel by Helen MacInnes
Above Suspicion (1943 film), starring Joan Crawford and based on the MacInnes novel
Above Suspicion, a 1993 novel by Joe Sharkey
Above Suspicion (2019 film), starring Emilia Clarke and Jack Huston based on the Sharkey novel
Above Suspicion (1995 film), starring William H. Macy and Christopher Reeve 
Above Suspicion, a 2004 novel by Lynda La Plante
Above Suspicion (TV series), a 2009 TV series based on the La Plante novel
"Above Suspicion" (Law & Order: Special Victims Unit), a 2012 episode of the legal drama Law & Order: Special Victims Unit